William Grounds (1874–1958) was a member of the New Zealand Legislative Council from 15 July 1940 to 14 July 1947; then 15 July 1947 to 31 December 1950, when the Council was abolished. He was appointed by the First Labour Government.

He was from Auckland, then Broadwood.

References 

1874 births
1958 deaths
Members of the New Zealand Legislative Council
New Zealand Labour Party MLCs
People from Auckland